O Guaraní is a 1926 Brazilian drama film directed by Vittorio Capellaro based on the novel The Guarani by José de Alencar.

The film premiered in Rio de Janeiro on 18 October 1926.

Cast
Mazza Amanda Mauceri as Ceci 
Gilberto Bianchini   
Vittorio Capellaro   
Domenico Cesarini   
Margarida Collado   
Tácito de Souza as Peri 
Armando Manceri   
Gastão Menichelli   
Giuseppe Menichelli   
Tina Montresor   
Giorgio Moro   
Ernesto Papini   
Luigi Pianconi as Dom Antônio de Mariz 
Mario Piazzi   
Giovanni Schiatti   
Greta Walkyria

External links
 

1926 drama films
1926 films
Brazilian black-and-white films
Brazilian silent films
Brazilian drama films
Silent drama films